The Adyar Library and Research Centre was founded in 1886 by theosophist Henry Steel Olcott. The library is at the Theosophical Society Adyar in Adyar, near Chennai.

History 
Henry Steel Olcott founded the "library Olcott" in December 1886. Olcott's small private collection of approx. 200 books in 24 languages was the core of library. During his travels in Asia, Olcott acquired more and often rare books for the library. After Olcott's death in 1907, the library was continued by other theosophists. Today, the library has approx. 250,000 books and 20,000 palm leaves. The library is today among the most important orientalist libraries in the world.

The library was at first situated inside the headquarters of the Theosophical Society. In 1966 it was moved to a separate building, the Adyar Library Building. It also has a public museum that shows old books and manuscripts. The Adyar library is also used by post-graduate students in Sanskrit and Indology of the University of Madras.

In 1990, a bequest by the  Australian philanthropist Elliston Campbell (1891 – 1990) further funded the Adyar Library and founded the Campbell Theosophical Research Library, in Sydney, Australia.

The University of Chicago is trying to preserve the old works in the Adyar library with modern techniques.

References

External links 
Adyar Library
Image of the library from kingsgarden.org

Theosophy
Libraries in Chennai
Library buildings completed in 1966
20th-century architecture in India
Libraries established in 1886